Wolfgang Müller von Königswinter (15 March 1816 in Königswinter – 29 June 1873 in Bad Neuenahr) was a German novelist and poet. He settled in Cologne, and became a popular poet, novelist, and chronicler of the Rhine region.

Biography
His real name was also the name of an earlier poet, Wilhelm Müller. In addition, he followed the poet's practice of appending the name of his birthplace to his original name. In 1835, he went to Bonn to study medicine at the wish of his father, also a physician. There he met Karl Joseph Simrock and Gottfried Kinkel. He continued his studies in Berlin in 1838 and graduated in 1840, after which he served his required time in the army as a surgeon. On his discharge in 1842, he went to Paris where he met Heinrich Heine, Georg Herwegh and Franz von Dingelstedt and continued his medical studies.

His stay in Paris was brief, since the death of his father pushed him to establish a practice in Düsseldorf. He married in 1847, and his family life was a great comfort and inspiration to him in later years. In 1848, he was a delegate to the preliminary parliament at Frankfurt. When that was over, he went back to writing sagas about the Rhine. In 1853, he gave up his medical practice and moved to Cologne, and gradually gave up medicine to devote himself to literature. He briefly went back to practicing medicine during the Franco-Prussian War and wrote some patriotic poems on this occasion.

Poetry
He is well known for his poem Merlin der Zauberer (“Merlin the Magician,” 1857).  Verse epics or narratives in the German Arthurian Literature tradition were undertaken with various success from the mid-18th century forward.  In contrast to Romantic poets like Karl Leberecht Immermann for whom Merlin represented the spirit of nature, Müller created a “modern Merlin” who, as Niniane's lover, uses his wisdom to resolve the conflict created by his revelation of the love affair of Guinevere.  The Merlin-Niniane relationship is presented as uncharacteristically positive compared to other depictions in the Arthurian cannon.

Another well-known poem is Mein Herz ist am Rhein (“My heart is by the Rhine”). Six volumes of his selected poems were published under the title Dichtungen eines rheinischen Poeten (“Poesies of a Rhine poet,” 1871-76).

Müller's poetry finds much of its material in the Rhine, its beauty, its legends, and the life of its people. His verses were not imposing in their depth of passion, originality or flights of imagination, but won the reader through their free and fresh aura, their musical voice, their tender mellowness and their poetical sensuality. They were characterized by beauty and health.

Composer Sophie Seipt (1812-1889) used Muller’s text for her song “Auf eines Berges Hohen.”

Books

The more important of his books are:
 Gedichte (“Poems,” 1847; 3d ed. 1868)
 Düsseldorfer Künstler aus den letzten fünfundzwanzig Jahren (1854)
 Der Rattenfänger von Sankt Goar (“The rat catcher of St. Goar,” 1856)
 Liederbuch (“Songbook,” 1857; 4th ed. 1871)
 Lorelei, an epic cycle (1851; 4th ed. 1873)
 Erzählungen eines rheinischen Chronisten (“Tales of a Rhine chronicler,” 1860-61)
 Im Rittersaal (“In the hall of knights,” 1874).

References

Sources

Attribution
 
  This publication in turn cites:
 Joesten, Wolfgang Müller'' (Cologne, 1895)

External links
 
 

1816 births
1873 deaths
People from Königswinter
People from the Province of Jülich-Cleves-Berg
19th-century German physicians
German medical writers
19th-century German poets
German politicians
German male poets
German male novelists
19th-century German novelists
19th-century German male writers
19th-century German writers
German male non-fiction writers